Hydrastinine is a semisynthetic alkaloid from the hydrolysis of the alkaloid hydrastine, which was found naturally in small quantities in Hydrastis canadensis L. (Ranunculaceae).  Hydrastinine was produced by oxidative splitting of hydrastine hydrochloride with nitric acid in good yield. The drug was patented by Bayer as a haemostatic drug during the 1910s.

The first known synthesis of methylenedioxymethamphetamine (MDMA) was actually an intermediate in the synthesis of the methylated analogue of hydrastinine, methylhydrastinine. It was only reviewed for its activity many years after its original synthesis.

Hydrastinine has also been found as an impurity or side product in MDMA synthesis performed by low pressure amination of 3,4-methylenedioxyphenylpropan-2-one with methylamine.

References 

Alkaloids
5,6,7,8-Tetrahydro-(1,3)dioxolo(4,5-g)isoquinolines